La Mallorquina is a restaurant in San Juan, Puerto Rico that specializes in the making of Puerto Rican and Spanish-particularly Palma de Mallorca-cuisine such as asopao, gazpacho, arroz con pollo, paella and flan.

It opened in 1848 and has been run by the Rojos family since 1900 and some historians claim that La Mallorquina is the first eating establishment in Puerto Rico.
The restaurant's original owners, Antonio Vidal Llinás and others, came from Palma de Mallorca, Spain; that's why they named their restaurant La Mallorquina, which loosely translated into English means The Woman from Mallorca.

Puerto Rico's first elected governor, Luis Muñoz Marín, was also one of the famous people to visit the restaurant.

See also
Puerto Rican cuisine
Spanish cuisine

References

External links

Companies based in San Juan, Puerto Rico
1848 establishments in Puerto Rico
Restaurants in Puerto Rico
Puerto Rican brands
Restaurants established in 1848